Anticinolis or Antikinolis, also known as Anticimolis or Antikimolis (Ἀντίκιμωλις), was a small town on the coast of ancient Paphlagonia, located 80 stadia from Cinolis.

Its site is located opposite to Cinolis in Asiatic Turkey.

References

Populated places in ancient Paphlagonia
Former populated places in Turkey
History of Kastamonu Province